Windows Internet Name Service (WINS) is the Microsoft implementation of NetBIOS Name Service (NBNS), a name server and service for NetBIOS computer names. Effectively, WINS is to NetBIOS names what DNS is to domain names — a central mapping of host names to network addresses. Like the DNS, it is implemented in two parts, a server service (that manages the embedded Jet Database, server to server replication, service requests, and conflicts) and a TCP/IP client component which manages the client's registration and renewal of names, and takes care of queries. Basically, Windows Internet Name Service (WINS) is a legacy computer name registration and resolution service that maps computer NetBIOS names to IP addresses.

WINS is Microsoft's predecessor to DNS for name resolution. Though WINS has not been deprecated, Microsoft advise against new deployments.

References

External links
Official sources
 Microsoft TechNet: Windows Internet Name Service Overview (Chapter 12 of the downloadable book "TCP/IP Fundamentals for Microsoft Windows")
 Microsoft TechNet: WINS Technical Reference
 Microsoft TechNet: WINS Concepts
 MSKB837391: Exchange Server 2003 and Exchange 2000 Server require NetBIOS name resolution for full functionality
Other
 Name Resolution chapter in Using Samba online book (also published by O'Reilly as ), which talks about WINS.

Microsoft server technology
Windows communication and services